The Eurovision Song Contest 2001 was the 46th edition of the Eurovision Song Contest. Organised by the European Broadcasting Union (EBU) and host broadcaster Danmarks Radio (DR), the contest was held at the Parken Stadium on 12 May 2001. The contest was presented by Danish television presenter Natasja Crone Back and actor Søren Pilmark.

Twenty-three countries took part in the contest. Bosnia and Herzegovina, Lithuania, Poland, Portugal, and Slovenia returned after their relegation from the previous edition. Greece also returned after their two-year absence, following financial trouble.
Meanwhile, Austria, Belgium, Cyprus, Finland, Macedonia, Romania, and Switzerland were relegated.

The winner was Estonia with the song "Everybody", performed by Tanel Padar, Dave Benton and 2XL, and written by Ivar Must and Maian-Anna Karmas. This was the first time the contest was won by one the countries from the former Eastern bloc that debuted in the contest in the 1990s. Denmark, Greece, France and Sweden rounded out the top five with Greece achieving its best result up to that point in the contest. Meanwhile, Ireland finished in 21st place, giving the nation its worst placement up to that point.

Location 

Copenhagen, the capital of Denmark, was the chosen host city. The venue choice for the contest was Parken Stadium, the national football stadium, located in the Indre Østerbro district of Copenhagen, Denmark, built from 1990 to 1992.

The Danish national broadcaster DR faced some problems whilst organising the contest such as a lack of funds and the search for a suitable venue. The three largest cities in Denmark - Copenhagen, Aarhus and Odense - all made bids to host the contest. Eventually, DR chose the large football stadium Parken as the host venue, after the company running the stadium agreed to add a retractable roof to the building. This solution made it the biggest venue ever to host a Eurovision Song Contest with room for an audience of 38,000, breaking the record of 16,000 held by the previous year's hosts Sweden. However, the scale of it all wasn't entirely a success: many audience members could not see the stage, and for many entries the hall appeared to be too big.

Production
The Eurovision Song Contest 2001 was produced by the Danish public broadcaster Danmarks Radio (DR). Jørgen Ramskov served as executive producer, Jan Frifelt served as director and Christine Marchal-Ortiz served as Executive Supervisor. Television presenter Natasja Crone Back and actor Søren Pilmark were the presenters of the 2001 contest.

Rehearsals in the venue for the competing acts were held from 7 to 12 May 2001. Four technical rehearsals from 7 to 10 May and two dress rehearsals on 11 and 12 May were held in a lead up to the contest.

The logo for this year's contest was developed by Danish companies Kontrapunkt, 2Graphic Design and EventRelations. It was made out of four circles, placed in the shape of a heart. The four circles were also present in the stage design, with the light construction made of the same four rings. The whole rig could be formed into various shapes to add to each country's staging. The design was described by its designers as "a modern expression of a heart which symbolises openness, warmth, attitudes, pulse and movement".

The draw to the determine the running order of competing countries was held on 21 November 2000.

A compilation album featuring all 23 competing entries was released on 5 May 2001 by EMI Records and CMC International.

Opening and interval acts
The show was opened by the last year's Eurovision winners, the Olsen Brothers, with a snippet from their winning Eurovision song "Fly on the Wings of Love", followed by their latest single "Walk Right Back".

The interval-act featured medley of Aqua songs performed by Aqua and Safri Duo.

Format

Entries 
Each participating broadcaster was represented in the contest by one song, which was required to be no longer than three minutes in duration. A maximum of six performers were allowed on stage during each country's performance, and all performers must have reached the age of 16 in the year of the contest. Selected entries were not permitted to be released commercially before 1 January 2001, and were then only allowed to be released in the country they represented until after the contest was held. Entries were required to be selected by each country's participating broadcaster by 11 March, and the final submission date for all selected entries to be received by the contest organisers was set for 16 March. This submission was required to include a sound recording of the entry and backing track for use during the contest, a video presentation of the song on stage being performed by the artists, and the text of the song lyrics in its original language and translations in French and English for distribution to the participating broadcasters, their commentators and juries.

Voting procedure 

The results of the 2001 contest were determined through the same scoring system as had first been introduced in : each country awarded twelve points to its favourite entry, followed by ten points to its second favourite, and then awarded points in decreasing value from eight to one for the remaining songs which featured in the country's top ten, with countries unable to vote for their own entry. Each participating country was required to use televoting to determine their points. Viewers had a total of five minutes to register their vote by calling one of twenty-two different telephone numbers to represent the twenty-three competing entries except that which represented their own country, with voting lines opening following the performance of the last competing entry. Once phone lines were opened a video recap containing short clips of each competing entry with the accompanying phone number for voting was shown in order to aid viewers during the voting window. Systems were also put in place to prevent lobby groups from one country voting for their song by travelling to other countries.

Countries which were unable to hold a televote due to technological limitations were granted an exception, and their points were determined by an assembled jury of eight individuals, which was required to be split evenly between members of the public and music professionals, comprised additionally of an equal number of men and women, and below and above 30 years of age. Countries using televoting were also required to appoint a back-up jury of the same composition which would be called into action upon technical failure preventing the televote results from being used. Each jury member voted in secret and awarded between one and ten votes to each participating song, excluding that from their own country and with no abstentions permitted. The votes of each member were collected following the country's performance and then tallied by the non-voting jury chairperson to determine the points to be awarded.

Participating countries
Per the rules of the contest twenty-three countries were allowed to participate in the event. Bosnia and Herzegovina, Greece, Lithuania, Poland and Portugal and Slovenia returned after being relegated from the previous year's event. 2000 participants Austria, Belgium, Cyprus, Finland, Macedonia, Romania and Switzerland were absent from this edition.

Qualification
Due to the high number of countries wishing to enter the contest a relegation system was introduced in 1993 in order to reduce the number of countries which could compete in each year's contest. Any relegated countries would be able to return the following year, thus allowing all countries the opportunity to compete in at least one in every two editions. The relegation rules introduced for the 1997 contest were again utilised ahead of the 2001 contest, based on each country's average points total in previous contests. The twenty-three participants were made up of the previous year's winning country, "Big Four" countries, the twelve countries which had obtained the highest average points total over the preceding five contests, and any eligible countries which did not compete in the 2000 contest. In cases where the average was identical between two or more countries the total number of points scored in the most recent contest determined the final order.

The calculations used to determine the countries relegated for the 2001 contest are outlined in the table below.

Table key
  Automatic qualifier
  Qualifier

Returning artists

Participants and results 

The contest took place on 12 May 2001. The table below outlines the participating countries, the order in which they performed, the competing artists and songs, and the results of the voting.

The winner was Estonia represented by the song "Everybody", composed by Ivar Must, written by Maian-Anna Kärmas and performed by Tanel Padar, Dave Benton and 2XL. This marked Estonia's first victory in the contest. Norway meanwhile finished in last place for the ninth time.

Prior to the contest Greece were hotly tipped to win by the bookmakers, Sweden the second favourites, with France, Slovenia and host country Denmark expected to round out the top 5. However, as the voting progressed it quickly became a two-horse race between host Denmark and surprisingly Estonia.

Dave Benton, who was born and raised in Aruba, was the first black person and, at the age of 50 years and 101 days, the oldest contestant at the time to win the contest.

Detailed voting results 

The majority of participating countries held a televote, where the top ten most voted for songs were awarded the 12, 10, 8, 7, 6, 5, 4, 3, 2, 1 points. This year the EBU introduced for the first time a mix of voting systems (50% televoting and 50% jury) for those countries that didn't want to use 100% televoting. Only three votes were allowed per household.

According to the EBU rules, every broadcaster was free to make a choice between the full televoting system and the mixed 50-50 system. In exceptional circumstances, where televoting was not possible at all, only a jury was used: Bosnia and Herzegovina, Turkey and Russia. Only a few countries are confirmed to have used the mixed voting system: Croatia, Greece and Malta.

12 points
Below is a summary of all 12 points in the final:

Spokespersons 
Each country nominated a spokesperson who was responsible for announcing, in English or French, the votes for their respective country. Spokespersons at the 2001 contest are listed below.

 Marlayne
 Eva María Jónsdóttir 
 Segmedina Srna
 Roald Øyen
 
 Larisa Verbitskaya
 Josefine Sundström
 Loreta Tarozaitė
 Renārs Kaupers
 
 
 Bláthnaid Ní Chofaigh
 
 Corinne Hermès
 Meltem Ersan Yazgan
 Colin Berry
 
 
 Axel Bulthaupt
 Ilomai Küttim "Elektra"
 Marbeck Spiteri
 
 Gry Johansen

Broadcasts 

Each participating broadcaster was required to relay live and in full the contest via television. Non-participating EBU member broadcasters were also able to relay the contest as "passive participants"; any passive countries wishing to participate in the following year's event were also required to provide a live broadcast of the contest or a deferred broadcast within 24 hours. Broadcasters were able to send commentators to provide coverage of the contest in their own native language and to relay information about the artists and songs to their viewers. Known details on the broadcasts in each country, including the specific broadcasting stations and commentators, are shown in the tables below.

Viewing figures

Incidents 
Controversy was again rife in the contest: the United Kingdom TV commentator Terry Wogan repeatedly made critical comments about the hosts, and dubbed them "Doctor Death and the Tooth Fairy/The Little Mermaid" after providing their entire commentary in rhyming couplets. The Danes were so offended that the BBC was obliged to issue an apology on Wogan's comments.

Controversy also surrounded the Swedish song, "Listen To Your Heartbeat", which was repeatedly accused as a plagiarism of the Belgian entry for the 1996 contest, "Liefde is een kaartspel". Eventually the EBU decided for the matter to be settled in court, with the song allowed to compete as long as the courts did not declare the song as plagiarism. At first this was denied by the Swedish songwriters, one of whom was Thomas G:son, but after the Belgian songwriters and the author's organisation SABAM pressed for legal action, a cash settlement was agreed.

During the voting the Danish band Aqua performed with a medley of their singles, with percussion ensemble Safri Duo performing in the medley. Although enjoyable, people complained about it being a little bit "rude" as there was some swearing during the performance, both at the beginning and end of "Barbie Girl".

Other awards

Barbara Dex Award
The Barbara Dex Award is the award, created by fansite House of Eurovision, was awarded to the performer deemed to have been the "worst dressed" among the participants. The winner in 2001 was Polish representative Piasek, as determined by the visitors of the website House of Eurovision.

Notes and references

Notes

References

External links

 
2001
Music festivals in Denmark
2001 music festivals
2001 in Denmark
2001 in Copenhagen
Culture in Copenhagen
May 2001 events in Europe
Events in Copenhagen